Amherst is an unincorporated community in Marshall County, South Dakota, United States. Although not tracked by the Census Bureau, Amherst has been assigned the ZIP code of 57421.

History
A post office called Amherst was established in 1887. The community most likely takes its name from Amherst, Massachusetts. Approximately two and half miles southeast of the village a rupture of the Keystone Pipeline caused what is being called the largest oil spill in South Dakota history on November 16, 2017. The spill is an area about 100 yards in radius within a conservation reserve field about a mile east of 416 Avenue south of the village.

References

Unincorporated communities in Marshall County, South Dakota
Unincorporated communities in South Dakota